Ceratozetidae is a family of mites belonging to the order Oribatida.

Genera

Genera:
 Adoribatella Woolley, 1967
 Allozetes Berlese, 1913
 Austroceratobates Mahunka, 1985

References

Acari